Juan Pedro Rombys Aguzzi (born 5 March 1987) is a Uruguayan rugby union player who generally plays as a prop and has represented Uruguay internationally since 2008. He was included in the Uruguayan squad for the 2019 Rugby World Cup in Japan (the first time the tournament was held in Japan and indeed Asia). This tournament also marked his first World Cup appearance for Uruguay.

Career 
He made his international debut for Uruguay against Argentina on 31 May 2008. He has subsequently made several starting appearances and was substituted into Uruguay's famous victory against Fiji on 25 September 2019. Quite remarkably, in 2012 he gave up the sport and continued working in agriculture, only returning to the sport during the 2018 season. This successful comeback highlights a theme in the Uruguay team, who have in the past been accurately described as "amateur players" and who must often maintain jobs alongside the sport.

References 

1987 births
Living people
Uruguayan rugby union players
Uruguay international rugby union players
Rugby union props